"Shoot for the Moon" is a 1982 song by Poco, written by Rusty Young.  It was the second of three singles released from their Ghost Town LP, and the bigger hit of the two which reached the charts. 

The song reached #50 on the U.S. Billboard Hot 100 and #44 on Cash Box during the late winter of 1983. It also peaked at #10 on the Adult Contemporary chart. Unlike most of their other hits, the song did not chart in Canada. 

Billboard highlighted the song's "dreary optimism" and "four–

part harmonies."

Chart history

References

External links
  

1982 songs
1982 singles
Songs written by Rusty Young (musician)
Poco songs
Atlantic Records singles